Reist Rocks is a small group of rocks on the Antarctic coast, 8 nautical miles (15 km) west of Snyder Rocks. First mapped from air photos taken by U.S. Navy Operation Highjump (1946–47). Named by Advisory Committee on Antarctic Names (US-ACAN) for Wilbur H. Reist, tractor driver with U.S. Navy Operation Windmill (1947–48), who assisted in transporting shore parties that established astronomical control stations from Wilhelm II Coast to Budd Coast.

Rock formations of Wilkes Land